List of the Swiss Inventory of Cultural Property of National and Regional Significance in the Canton of Bern, including in the city of Bern.

The cultural property 2009 class A listings are sorted by municipality and contains 345 individual buildings, 43 collections, 30 archaeological sites, and 4 other special sites or objects.

Lists
Due to number of cultural properties of national significance in the canton of Bern, and the city of Bern, the listings have been divided alphabetically into 2 lists. 
 List of cultural property of national significance in Switzerland: Bern A-M
 List of cultural property of national significance in Switzerland: Bern N-Z

See also

References
 All entries, addresses, and coordinates are from:

External links
 Swiss Inventory of Cultural Property of National and Regional Significance (KGS 2009 edition) links:
—
KGS Class B objects—
KGS  Geographic Information System−GIS
—

 01
Canton of Bern
Cultural01
Cultural01
Cultural01
Cultural01